Hans-Joachim Koellreutter (2 September 1915 – 13 September 2005) was a Brazilian composer, teacher and musicologist.

Koellreutter was born in Freiburg, Germany and lived in Brazil from 1937 onward, where he became one of the country's most influential musicians.

In Brazil Koellreuter taught many prominent composers, including Gilberto Mendes, Cláudio Santoro, Antônio Carlos Jobim, Denis Mandarino, Jayme Amatnecks, among others. 

He brought the theory of atonal music to Brazil, creating the group "Musica Viva" and inflating the debate between the "Nationalists" and "Serialists". 

While the former group believed in the use of folklore material for the development of their compositions, the latter believed that the more rational approach of the European school was the path to truly contemporary works. This debate played a central role in the esthetic developments of Brazilian classical music throughout the 20th century.

Death
Koellreutter died in São Paulo, Brazil, 11 days after his 90th birthday.

References

1915 births
2005 deaths
Brazilian composers
German composers
German emigrants to Brazil
20th-century German musicians
Commanders Crosses of the Order of Merit of the Federal Republic of Germany

Brazilian people of German descent